Soda Springs may refer to several places in the United States:

Soda Springs, California (disambiguation)
Soda Springs, Mendocino County, California (disambiguation)
Soda Springs (near Boonville), Mendocino County, California
Soda Springs (near Burbeck), Mendocino County, California
 Soda Springs, Nevada County, California
 Soda Springs, Placer County, California
 Soda Springs, Tulare County, California
 Soda Springs, California, former name of Zzyzx, California
Soda Springs, Idaho, a small city in Caribou County, Idaho
Soda Springs, Montana, an unincorporated place in Yellowstone County, Montana
Soda Springs, Texas, an unincorporated place in Caldwell County, Texas

See also
 Soda spring
 Soda Springs Cabin, in Yosemite National Park